William Hudson Farnham (December 16, 1869 – April 5, 1940) was a manufacturer and political figure in Nova Scotia, Canada. He represented Digby County in the Nova Scotia House of Assembly from 1925 to 1928 as a Liberal-Conservative member.

He was born in Canard, Nova Scotia, the son of Reuben Farnham and Eliza Hudson. In 1901, Farnham married Blanche S. Barden. He died in Digby at the age of 70.

References 
 A Directory of the Members of the Legislative Assembly of Nova Scotia, 1758-1958, Public Archives of Nova Scotia (1958)

1869 births
1940 deaths
Progressive Conservative Association of Nova Scotia MLAs